Chorney Beach is a resort village in the Canadian province of Saskatchewan within Census Division No. 10. It is on the shores of Fishing Lake in the Rural Municipality of Foam Lake No. 276.

History 
Chorney Beach incorporated as a resort village on January 1, 1991.

Demographics 

Government 
The Resort Village of Chorney Beach is governed by an elected municipal council and an appointed clerk. The mayor is Peter Olson.

See also 
List of communities in Saskatchewan
List of municipalities in Saskatchewan
List of resort villages in Saskatchewan
List of villages in Saskatchewan
List of summer villages in Alberta

References 

Resort villages in Saskatchewan
Foam Lake No. 276, Saskatchewan
Division No. 10, Saskatchewan